The 1907 Italian Athletics Championships  were held in Rome. it was the 2nd edition of the Italian Athletics Championships.

Champions

References

External links 
 Italian Athletics Federation

Italian Athletics Championships
Italian Athletics Outdoor Championships
1907 in Italian sport